Thomas Haselmere (fl. 1414) of Shaftesbury, Dorset, was an English Member of Parliament.

He was a Member (MP) of the Parliament of England for Shaftesbury in April 1414. He was Mayor of Shaftesbury 1414–15.

He was a descendant of John Haselmere, mayor of Shaftesbury 1331–2 and 1351–2.

References

14th-century births
15th-century deaths
English MPs April 1414
Mayors of Shaftesbury